Insect Queen refers to comic book characters from two different publishers

 Insect Queen (Marvel Comics), refers to two versions of this character
 Insect Queen (DC Comics), refers to primary versions of this character
 Insect Queen (Amalgam Comics), refers to the version of this character as used by Amalgam Comics (a joint venture between DC and Marvel).